Pseudographis pinicola is a species of fungus belonging to the family Triblidiaceae.

It is native to Eurasia.

References

Leotiomycetes
Taxa named by William Nylander (botanist)
Fungi described in 1868